The Tohoku Collegiate American Football Association (東北学生アメリカンフットボール連盟) is an American college football league made up of colleges and universities in northeastern part of Honshu,  particularly the Tohoku region.

Overview
The Hokkaido American Football Association is the highest level of collegiate football in northeastern Honshu.

Member schools

Division 1

Division 2

Pine Bowl

The champion of the Tohoku League plays in the Pine Bowl against the champion of the Hokkaido League for the North Japan championship.

External links
  (Japanese)

American football in Japan
American football leagues
College athletics conferences in Japan